Wohlen railway station, also known as Wohlen AG railway station, is a railway station in the municipality of Wohlen in the Swiss canton of Aargau. The station is located on the standard gauge Rupperswil–Immensee line of Swiss Federal Railways, between Lenzburg and Rotkreuz. The Aargau Verkehr Bremgarten–Dietikon line, a  gauge line with some characteristics of a roadside tramway, terminates at a platform opposite the SBB platforms.

Services
The following services stop at Wohlen:

 Zürich S-Bahn:
 Aargau S-Bahn:

All trains except the S17 run on the Rupperswil–Immensee line, while the S17 operates over the Bremgarten–Dietikon line.

Gallery

References

External links 
 
 

Railway stations in the canton of Aargau
Swiss Federal Railways stations
Railway stations in Switzerland opened in 1874